Ban Pong is tambon (subdistrict) of Wiang Pa Pao District, in Chiang Rai Province, Thailand.

Administration
The subdistrict has a Tambon Administrative Organization (TAO) as its local government, created in 1997.

The subdistrict is divided into seven administrative villages (mubans).

History
The subdistrict was created by splitting off four administrative villages from Pa Ngio Subdistrict, as announced in the Royal Gazette in 1947.

References

External links
ThaiTambon.com 

Tambon of Chiang Rai province
Populated places in Chiang Rai province